Oreina bifrons is a species of broad-shouldered leaf beetles belonging to the family Chrysomelidae, subfamily Chrysomelinae.

Subspecies
Subspecies include:
Oreina bifrons bifrons (Fabricius, 1792) 
Oreina bifrons cadorensis Bechyné, 1958 
Oreina bifrons decora (Richter, 1820) 
Oreina bifrons gadmena Bechyné, 1958 
Oreina bifrons heterocera (Reitter, 1917) 
Oreina bifrons monticola (Duftschmid, 1825)

Description
These beetles are characterised by colour polymorphism.

Distribution
This species can be found in Europe, in the Alps, Sudetes, Carpathians and Balkans.

Biology
These beetles are viviparous. Larvae mainly feed on Chaerophyllum hirsutum.

References

External links
 INPN

Chrysomelinae
Beetles of Europe
Beetles described in 1792